Shum is a town and union council of the Dera Bugti District in the Balochistan province of Pakistan.

References

Populated places in Dera Bugti District
Union councils of Balochistan, Pakistan